Claude Arribas (born 13 August 1951) is a French former professional footballer who played as a midfielder and defender.

International career 
Arribas was a youth international for France at various levels, including at under-21 level.

Personal life 
Arribas is of Basque Spanish descent; his father José, who was a football player and manager, was born in Bilbao. Claude played under his father when he was manager at Nantes.

After retiring from football, Arribas became a sales adviser in a food company near Angers.

Honours 
Nantes
 Division 1: 1972–73
Coupe de France runner-up: 1969–70, 1972–73

References

External links 
 

1951 births
Living people
Footballers from Le Mans
French people of Spanish descent
French people of Basque descent
Association football midfielders
Association football defenders
FC Nantes players
Paris Saint-Germain F.C. players
FC Girondins de Bordeaux players
Stade Rennais F.C. players
AS Cannes players
Angers SCO players
Ligue 1 players
Ligue 2 players
France youth international footballers
France under-21 international footballers
French footballers